Qımılqışlaq (also, Kymylkyshlak and Kymylkyshlakh) is a village and municipality in the Khachmaz Rayon of Azerbaijan.  It has a population of 2,790.  The municipality consists of the villages of Qımılqışlaq, Mirzəməmmədqışlaq, and Şıxlar.

References 

Populated places in Khachmaz District